Slonim-2017 is a Belarusian football club based in Slonim, Grodno Region.

History 
The team was founded in 2013 as a result of merger between Beltransgaz Slonim and Kommunalnik Slonim. The new team is considered a successor to Beltransgaz. It inherited entire Beltransgaz squad with addition of a few Kommunalnik players, as well as Beltransgaz training facilities and a stadium previously shared by both teams. As Beltransgaz originally earned a spot in Belarusian First League for 2013 season, the spot is transferred to the new team. The merger was also necessary due to Beltransgaz's type of ownership which would've prevented them from obtaining a First League license.

In 2017, the club was renamed to Slonim-2017.

Current squad 
As of March 2023

References

External links
Official website (archived)

Football clubs in Belarus
Slonim
2013 establishments in Belarus
Association football clubs established in 2013